The  is a railway line in Japan operated by the East Japan Railway Company (JR East). The line officially begins at Nippori Station in Arakawa, Tokyo before the line officially ends at Iwanuma Station in Iwanuma, Miyagi. The line approximately parallels the Pacific coasts of Chiba, Ibaraki, and Fukushima Prefectures.

The name "Jōban" is derived from the names of the former provinces of Hitachi, and Iwaki, which are connected by the line to reach Tokyo.

After some major repairs, the section reopened on 14 March 2020 after 9 years without service.

History

The Mito Railway opened the line in sections between 1889 and 1905. The dates of the individual section openings are given below. After the line was nationalised in 1906, a program of double-tracking commenced in 1910, with the  section between Nippori and Yotsukura completed in 1925. The Hirono - Kido and Ono - Futaba sections were double-tracked in 1976.

The first section electrified was Nippori - Matsudo (at 1,500 V DC) in 1936, and extended to Toride in 1949. The Toride - Kusano section was electrified at 20 kV AC between 1961 and 1963, and extended to Iwanuma in 1967.

The 2011 Tōhoku earthquake and tsunami caused severe disruption to the line, with services to Iwaki ( from Nippori) re-established by 17 April, to Yotsukura (a further ) by 14 May, and to Hirono (another ) by 10 October 2011. Services on the  Hirono - Tatsuta section returned on 1 June 2014.

At the northern end, services on the isolated  Haranomachi - Soma section were restored on 21 December 2011, with services from Iwanuma to Hamayoshida restored on 16 March 2013. Services resumed on the  Haranomachi - Odaka section on 12 July 2016 and the  Hamayoshida - Soma section was rebuilt at a higher, tsunami-proof level, and reopened on 10 December 2016, re-establishing the connection to Sendai for stations north of Odaka. The line fully reopened on 14 March 2020.

Chronology

16 January 1889: Mito Railway (Mito — Oyama) begins operation.
26 November 1890: Mito Railway Freight Line (Mito — Nakagawa) begins operation.
1 March 1892: Mito Railway becomes part of the Nippon Railway.
4 November 1895: Nippon Railway Tsuchiura Line (Tsuchiura — Tomobe) begins operation.
1 December 1895: Hatori Station opens.
25 December 1896: Tsuchiura Line (Tabata — Tsuchiura), Sumidagawa Line (Tabata — Sumidagawa) begin operation.
25 February 1897: Iwaki Line (Mito — Taira [present-day Iwaki]) begins operation.
17 May 1897: Tsuchiura Line Kameari Station opens.
29 August 1897: Iwaki Line (Taira — Kunohama) begins operation.
10 November 1897: Iwaki Line (Nakamura [present-day Sōma] — Iwanuma) begins operation.
27 December 1897: Tsuchiura Line Kanamachi Station opens.
January 1898: Kitasenju — Sumidagawa connection opens.
1 April 1898: Ishigami Station opens.
3 April 1898: Iwaki Line (Haranomachi — Nakamura) begins operation.
11 May 1898: Iwaki Line (Odaka — Haranomachi) begins operation.
6 August 1898: Tsuchiura Line Mabashi Station opens.
23 August 1898: Iwaki Line (Kunohama — Odaka) begins operation, connecting Tabata and Iwanuma. Tsuchiura Line and Mito Line (Tomobe — Mito) and Iwaki Line are collectively renamed the Kaigan Line.
1 December 1898: Taka Station is renamed Iwaki-Ōta Station.
4 August 1900: Sanuki Station opens.
22 November 1904: Ōno Station opens.
1 April 1905: With the completion of the Mikawashima — Nippori connection, the present-day route is finished.  Nippori and Mikawashima Stations open. Service from Ueno to Tabata and back is abolished.
1 November 1906: Nippon Railway is nationalized.
25 March 1909: Tatsuta Station opens.
12 October 1909: Kaigan Line split and renamed: Jōban Line (Nippori — Iwanuma) and Sumidagawa Line (Tabata — Sumidagawa). Jōban Line also handles freight services.
16 February 1910: Minami-Nakagō Station opens.
18 March 1910: Katsuta and Ogitsu Stations open.
1 May 1911: Kita-Kogane Station opens.
5 May 1911: Sumidagawa Line is merged into the Jōban Line.
1 June 1915: Yoshida Station is renamed Hamayoshida Station.
15 March 1921: Yonomori Station opens.
15 August 1922: Nittaki Station opens.
2 February 1925: Kōen-Shimo Station opens, but only operates during the ume blossom-viewing season.
28 October 28, 1925: Nippori — Taira connection finished (joined with northern tracks in 1965).
11 December 1936: Nippori — Matsudo tracks are electrified.
1 October 1939: Shimomago Station is renamed Hitachi-Taga Station.
20 October 1939: Sukegawa Station is renamed Hitachi Station.
15 February 1944: Momouchi signal box is built between Namie and Odaka.
20 February 1944: Suetsugi signal box is built between Kunohama and Hirono.
1 June 1947: Suetsugi signal box becomes Suetsugi Station.
10 August 1948: Momouchi signal box becomes Momouchi Station.
10 May 1949: Shimoyama Station opens.
1 June 1949: Matsudo — Toride tracks are electrified.
6 July 1949: In what is known as the Shimoyama incident, JNR president at the time, Shimoyama Sadanori, is mysteriously found dead between Kita-Senju and Ayase Stations.
10 May 1950: Sekimoto Station is renamed Ōtsukō Station.
1 May 1952: Kita-Matsudo Station opens.
10 July 1952: Komagamine Station opens.
1 October 1953: Minami-Kashiwa Station opens.
20 December 1956: Tsuzura Station is renamed Uchigō Station.
1 April 1957: Ishigami Station is renamed Tōkai Station.
1 June 1958: Semi-express Tokiwa begins operation.
10 October 1958: The Limited express Hatsukari begins operation (Ueno — Aomori). It stops at Ueno, Mito, Taira, and Sendai Stations when it runs on the Jōban Line tracks.
1 October 1959: Nagatsuka Station is renamed Futaba Station.
1 October 1960: Kanayama signal box is built between Tatsuta and Tomioka. Ōkuma signal box is built between Watari and Iwanuma.
20 March 1961: Nakamura Station is renamed Sōma Station.
1 June 1961: Toride — Katsuta tracks are electrified.
3 May 1962: The  Rail Crash occurs between Mikawashima and Minami-Senju when an Iwaki-bound passenger train crashes into the wreckage of a crash between an Ueno-bound passenger train and an Ueno-bound freight train. 160 people die and 296 are injured in the incident.
1 October 1962: Katsuta — Takahagi tracks are electrified.
1 May 1963: Takahagi — Taira tracks are electrified.
20 April 1963: Takahira signal box is built between Haranomachi and Kashima.
30 September 1963: Taira — Kusano tracks are electrified.
5 March 1966: Tokiwa semi-express becomes an express.
1 February 1967: Kōen-Shimo Station is renamed Kairakuen Station.
20 August 1967: With the electrification of the Kusano — Iwanuma tracks, the entire Jōban Line becomes electrified.
1 October 1968: Hatsukari express is rerouted to the Tōhoku Main Line.
1 October 1969: Kairakuen Station becomes a temporary station. Seasonal Hitachi express begins operation.
10 April 1970: Freight line Kita-Kashiwa Station opens.
1 October 1970: Hitachi operates as a regular express.
20 April 1971: Construction of the Kita-Senju — Abiko Joban Local Line is finished and runs through service to the Eidan Subway Chiyoda Line (present-day Tokyo Metro Chiyoda Line). (The Chiyoda Line only ran as far as Kasumigaseki at the time). Tennōdai Station opens and Kita-Kashiwa Station is open to passengers.
1 April 1973: Shin-Matsudo Station opens.
31 March 1978: With the extension of its tracks to Yoyogi-Uehara Station, the Chiyoda Line shares tracks with the Odakyu Odawara Line up to Hon-Atsugi Station. 203 series trains are introduced to run through service to the Chiyoda Line.
15 November 1982: Jōban Line Local Service extended from Abiko — Toride.
1 February 1984: Mito — Nakagawa freight line is closed.
14 March 1985: Bampaku-Chūō Station is temporarily opened (until September 16) for the Tsukuba Expo '85. The Uchigō-System-Ku is abolished. The Tokiwa express is discontinued.
1 April 1987: With the split of JNR, the Joban Line becomes part of JR East.
2 August 1988: Ōkuma signal box becomes Ōkuma Station.
11 March 1989: 651 series Super Hitachi limited-express EMUs enter service.
1 February 1993: Kanayama signal box is abolished.
10 February 1993: Takahira signal box is abolished.
3 December 1994: Taira Station is renamed Iwaki Station.
1 December 1995: E501 series begins service between Ueno and Tsuchiura.
1 October 1997: E653 series Fresh Hitachi limited-express EMUs enter service.
14 March 1998: Hitachino-Ushiku Station opens where Bampaku-Chūō Station used to stand.
7 December 1998: 485 series Hitachi limited-express EMUs are retired.
3 March 2002: New E231 series EMUs introduced on commuter services.
13 March 2004: Kawajiri Station is renamed Jūō Station. Regular trains begin making stops at Mikawashima and Minami-Senju Stations throughout the day.
16 October 2004: Medium-distance trains are called rapid trains for the section between Ueno and Toride.
9 July 2005: New E531 series dual-voltage EMUs enter service on line.  Special Rapid Service begins between Ueno — Tsuchiura. Commuter Rapid service from Ueno ends. One Commuter Rapid service still runs from Mito to Ueno.
17 March 2006: All Commuter Rapid Service ends.
15 May 2006: Women-only cars introduced on Joban Local Line trains [7:10 – 9:30 AM measured by the time the trains pass through Ayase station] from Toride running through to Yoyogi-Uehara on the Tokyo Metro Chiyoda Line.
6 January 2007: Double-deck Green cars are phased in on E531 series EMUs running between Ueno and Takahagi. No Green car supplement is required until the start of the new timetable on 2007-03-18.
21 February 2007: E501 series EMUs removed from Ueno – Tsuchiura services.
18 March 2007: Full Green car service commences on E531 series EMUs running between Ueno and Takahagi; E501 series EMUs reassigned to Mito Line and Jōban services north of Tsuchiura become 10-car or 5-car formations only
15 March 2008: Suica use extended to stations between Hitachi and Takahagi
14 March 2009: Suica use extended to Takahagi – Iwaki and Haranomachi – Yamashita sections
9 September 2009: E233 series 10-car EMUs introduced on Chiyoda Line through services
11 March 2011: During the 2011 Tōhoku earthquake and tsunami, a 4-car train on the line was picked up off the tracks by the tsunami surge and overturned at Shinchi and Tomioka stations. All passengers from the train were evacuated before the tsunami came ashore. Tomioka was affected by the Fukushima nuclear disaster and was prohibited entrance without legal permission.
8 January 2014: Thales is selected to design Japan's first communications-based train control system (CBTC) on the line.
 1 June 2014: Train operations resumed between Hirono and Tatsuta.
 12 July 2016: Train operations were resumed between Odaka and Haranomachi stations in Minami-Soma, Fukushima Prefecture.
 20 August 2016: Station numbering introduced with Rapid services being assigned station numbers between JJ01 (Tokyo) and JJ24 (Toride). Station numbers were also assigned to local services between Ayase (JL19) and Toride (JL32).
 10 December 10, 2016: The  reconstructed section between Soma and Hamayoshida reopened.
 1 April 2017: Train services from Odaka south to Namie resumed.
 21 October 2017: Train services resumed north from Tatsuta to Tomioka.
 14 March  2020: The section between Tomioka and Namie reopens 9 years after the 2011 Tōhoku earthquake and tsunami reconstruction, bringing the full line back to service.
 13 March 2021 (planned): Automatic train operation will be activated on the Jōban Line (Local) between Ayase and Toride using the STO (Semi-Automatic) standard.
 12 March 2022: The number of direct trains on the Ueno Tokyo Line and Joban Line during the day increases to three per hour. During the daytime hours, the direct train operation between Shinagawa / Ueno and Mito is separated at Tsuchiura Station. Along with this, trains in the direction of Ueno and Mito at Tsuchiura Station will be connected at the same platform. 
 16 March 2022: Due to the 2022 Fukushima earthquake, a part of the platform was damaged at Nittaki Station in Soma City, and a part of the bridge between Kashima and Haranomachi in Minamisoma City was several tens of centimeters from the base. Confirmed damage such as misalignment. Hirono-Iwanuma will be suspended from driving. 
 18 March 2022: Yamashita-Resumed operation between Iwanuma. 
 21 March 2022: Resumed operation between Hirono-Tomioka and Shinchi-Yamashita .
 22 March 2022: Resumed operation between Tomioka and Haranomachi.
 24 March 2022: Haranomachi-Resumed operation between Shinchi and resumed operation on all lines.

Former connecting lines

 Tsuchiura Station: The Tsukura Railway opened a  line to Iwase on the Mito Line in 1918. Freight services ceased in 1981, and the line closed in 1987.
 Tsuchiura Station: A  line to Ami, electrified at 600 VDC, was operated by the Southern Electric Railway Co. between 1926/28 and 1938.
 Mito Station: The Mito Seashore Electric Railway Co. opened a line eventually extending  between Kamimito and Nakaminato-Cho, electrified at 600 VDC, between 1922 and 1930. It closed in sections between 1953 and 1966. At Onuki station ( from Mito) on this line the Kashima Light Railway Co. operated a   gauge line between 1926 and 1930 to Hokota (see Ishioka station entry below).
 Mito Station: The Mito Electric Railway Co. operated an  line to Okunotani (not electrified, despite the company name) between 1929 and 1936.
 Ishioka Station: The Kashima Sangu Railway opened a  line to Hokota between 1924 and 1929. Freight services ceased in 2002 and the line closed in 2007.
 Akatsuka Station: A  line to Gozenyama was opened by the Ibaraki Railway Co. in 1926/27. In 1944/45 the first  of the line to Minami Hakamatsuka was electrified. The line closed in sections between 1965 and 1971.
 Tokai Station: The Ibaraki Prefectural Government operated a   gauge line to Muramutsu between 1926 and 1933.
 Omika Station: An  line to Johoku Ota (now Hitachi-Ota on the Suigun Line) was opened by the Johoku Electric Railway in 1928/29. In 1944 the company merged with the Hitachi Electric Railway, and a  line to Akukawa was opened in 1947. Both lines were electrified at 600 V DC from opening. CTC signalling was commissioned in 1969, and in 1971 the lines became the first electric railway in Japan converted to a one-person operation. Both lines closed in 2005.
 Izumi Station: The Onahama Horse tram opened a  gauge line  to its namesake town in 1907, and extended the line a further  to Ena in 1916. The Onahama - Ena section closed in 1936, the company renamed itself the Onahama Port Railway in 1939, and converted the line to  gauge in 1941. In 1965 a typhoon caused the collapse of a retaining wall, and the Onahama - Ena section formally closed in 1967. The passenger service on the Izumi - Onahama section ceased in 1972, the line is now freight-only operated by the Fukushima Rinkai Railway.
 Yumoto station: The  gauge Iwaki Coalmine Railway operated to Onahama between 1905 and 1944.
 Yumoto station: A   line to Nagahashi was operated by the Iwaki City Council between 1914 and 1929.
 Uchigo station: The Furukawa Co. built a   gauge line to the Kita-Yoshima coal mine in 1905. The mine and line closed in 1969.
 Iwaki station: The Yoshima and Akai local railways connected here, details of these lines are not currently available.

Basic data
Operators, distances:
East Japan Railway Company (JR East) (Services and tracks)
Nippori – Haranomachi – Iwanuma: 
Mikawashima – Sumidagawa – Minami-Senju (Sumidagawa freight branch): 
Mikawashima – Tabata (Tabata freight branch): 
Japan Freight Railway Company (JR Freight) (Services)
Mikawashima – Haranomachi – Iwanuma: 
Mikawashima – Sumidagawa – Minami-Senju (Sumidagawa freight branch): 
Mikawashima – Tabata (Tabata freight branch): 
Double/quadruple tracking:
Quadruple: Ayase – Toride
Double: Nippori – Ayase, Toride – Yotsukura, Hirono – Kido, Ōno – Futaba
Electrification:
1,500 V DC: Nippori – Toride, Mikawashima – Sumidagawa – Minami-Senju, Mikawashima – Tabata
20 kV AC, 50 Hz: Fujishiro – Iwanuma. This section of the line, along with a nearby section of the Tsukuba Express in Ibaraki Prefecture (Moriya – Tsukuba), uses alternating current in order to minimize interference with the nearby Kakioka Magnetic Observatory in Ishioka.
The dead section is located between Toride and Fujishiro
Railway signalling:
Automatic Train Control (ATC): Ayase – Toride
Automatic Signaling Block for all other sections
operation control
ATOS: Ueno – Hatori, local train track Ayase – Toride 
CTC: All other sections

Services
The Jōban Line connects Tokyo and the Tōhoku region. After the opening of the Tōhoku Shinkansen in 1982, the Jōban Line was split into two parts at Iwaki. South of Iwaki is mainly double track (Ayase - Toride is quad track), and north of Iwaki is predominantly single track. After the Fukushima disaster in 2011, the Jōban Line is further segmented in the Iwaki – Sendai section.

Shinagawa – Ueno – Iwaki

This entire section is served by a variety of services, which will be explained below by the sections where they operate in.

Limited express trains operate across the entire section.

Shinagawa – Ueno – Toride
This section is mainly served by local, rapid, medium-distance train services serving the Greater Tokyo area.

 Local (各駅停車): These local trains are commonly referred to as the Jōban Line (Local) 常磐線各駅停車. Trains usually originate/terminate at Abiko.
 Rapid (快速): Rapid trains are commonly referred to as the Jōban Line (Rapid) 常磐線快速. Some trains go on to the Narita Line to  via Abiko and are referred to as Jōban・Narita Line (常磐・成田線) trains.
 Local (Medium distance) (普通) : The "local" here refers to medium distance trains that operate north beyond Toride and stop at all stations north of Toride. South of Toride, they operate as rapid services and are referred to as such.
These trains skip stations that even rapid trains would stop. This service is created to compete with the neighbouring railway line, the Tsukuba Express.

Shinagawa – Ueno – Mito – Katsuta
Trains that run beyond Toride are distinctly referred to as the Jōban Line (常磐線), without the term "Rapid". Trains that are called Jōban Line (Rapid) cannot go beyond Toride, as their rolling stock cannot be powered by alternating current, which is the type of electrification that the section uses.

This section is mainly served by local trains.

 Local (普通) : These trains stop at every station north of Toride. Hence the name "local". There are two types of local trains:
Medium distance : These medium distance trains, as mentioned above, operate from central Tokyo to the north of Toride and stop at all stations there.
 Special rapid (特別快速) : Special Rapid trains stop at every station between Toride and Tsuchiura, so they're essentially the same as the medium distance trains, but become a different service once past south of Toride.

Mito – Iwaki
This section is mainly served by local trains.

 Local (普通) : These trains stop at every station, operating between Mito and Takahagi / Iwaki

Iwaki – Sendai
Before the Fukushima Daiichi nuclear disaster and the 2011 Tōhoku earthquake and tsunami, local trains and limited express trains used to run across the entire section. However, due to the damages caused after the disaster, the section between Tomioka to Harunomachi had to be closed down, and services were suspended. After certain sections of the line were reconstructed, regular services were gradually allowed to resume.

Iwaki – Tomioka
This section is served by local service trains. This section was closed due to damage caused by the 2011 Tōhoku earthquake and tsunami, but it has since reopened. (explained below).

Tomioka – Namie
This section, which extends through the exclusion zone surrounding the Fukushima Daiichi nuclear meltdown, was suspended after the 2011 disaster. This section re-opened on 14 March 2020. Before this date, services were provided by an interim bus service.

Namie – Sendai
This section is served by local service trains, which serves the Greater Sendai area.

The section was once partially closed due to the 2011 disaster, but has since reopened in stages. Train services between Namie and Odaka resumed on 1 April 2017. Train services between Tatsuta and  resumed on 21 October 2017.

Station list

The above is a diagram indicating Jōban Line service patterns within Greater Tokyo.
For more information on limited express services (i.e.Hitachi and Tokiwa), see their respective pages.

Shinagawa – Ueno – Mito – Iwaki
 Legend
 Trains stop at stations marked "●" and pass those marked "｜"
 Few trains stop at stations marked "△"
 Note: Trains going beyond Tsuchiura and listed as ‘15 cars’ on timetables will be reduced to a max to 10 cars past Tsuchiura station due to shorter platform lengths

Iwaki – Iwanuma – Sendai
Legend

Trains stop at stations marked "●" and pass those marked "｜"
Few trains stop at stations marked "△"
Stations marked "◇" are located on passing loops and allow trains in opposite directions to pass each other

Rolling stock

Local / Rapid service stock

Shinagawa – Ueno – Iwaki

 Jōban Line (Local)
 JR East stock
 E233-2000 series (x19) 10-car EMUs 
 Tokyo Metro stock
 Tokyo Metro 16000 series (x37) 10-car EMUs
 Odakyu stock
Odakyu 4000 series

 Jōban Line (Rapid)
E231-0 series 10+5-car EMUs

Jōban Line
E501 series 10 and 5 car EMUs (Operates only between Tsuchiura and Kusano)
E531 series 10 and 5-car EMUs (can run as 15 car configuration as far as Tsuchiura station)

Iwaki – Sendai

701 series
719 series
E531 series 
E721 series

Limited express stock
 E657 series 10-car EMUs (Hitachi/Tokiwa services) (from 17 March 2012)

Past
 Kiha 58 DMUs (Tokiwa and Okukuji rapid services) (through services to Suigun Line) (until March 1985)
 80 series EMUs (Hitachi services) (from October 1969 until October 1972)
 401 series EMUs (cream with blue stripe) (from June 1961 until 1987)
 485 series EMUs (Hitachi services) (from October 1972 until December 1998)
 103 series 10+5-car EMUs (emerald green livery) (from December 1967 until March 2006)
 103-1000 series 10-car EMUs (Tokyo Metro Chiyoda Line through-running services, sea green stripe) (from 1971 until April 1986)
 403 series/415 series 7+4+4-car EMUs (cream with blue stripe) (from 1965 until March 2007)
 207–900 series 10-car EMU (x1) (Tokyo Metro Chiyoda Line through-running services, emerald green stripe) (from 1986 until December 2009)
 203 series 10-car EMUs (Tokyo Metro Chiyoda Line through-running services, emerald green stripe) (from 1982 until 26 September 2011)
 415–1500 series 4-car EMUs (blue stripe) (from 1986 until 2016)
651 series 7+4-car EMUs (x9) (Hitachi services) (from March 1989 until March 2015)
 E653 series 7+4-car EMUs (Fresh Hitachi services) (from October 1997 until March 2013)
 209–1000 series 10-car EMUs  (from 1999 until 13 October 2018)

See also
Tohoku Main Line

References

External links

 Stations of the Jōban Line (JR East) 

Jōban Line
Lines of East Japan Railway Company
Railway lines in Tokyo
Railway lines in Chiba Prefecture
Rail transport in Ibaraki Prefecture
Rail transport in Fukushima Prefecture
Rail transport in Miyagi Prefecture
1067 mm gauge railways in Japan
Railway lines opened in 1889
Articles containing video clips
1889 establishments in Japan